The Solihull Metropolitan Borough Council elections were held on Thursday, 5 May 1988, with one third of the council to be elected. Prior to the election, Packwood councillor, Kenneth Meeson, had defected from Independent to the Conservatives. The Conservatives retained control of the council.

Election result

|- style="background-color:#F9F9F9"
! style="background-color: " |
| Independent Ratepayers & Residents 
| align="right" | 1
| align="right" | 0
| align="right" | 0
| align="right" | 0
| align="right" | 5.9
| align="right" | 6.1
| align="right" | 3,539
| align="right" | -2.0%
|-

This result had the following consequences for the total number of seats on the council after the elections:

Ward results

|- style="background-color:#F6F6F6"
! style="background-color: " |
| colspan="2"   | Independent Ratepayers hold 
| align="right" | Swing
| align="right" | +6.0
|-

By-elections between 1988 and 1990

|- style="background-color:#F6F6F6"
! style="background-color: " |
| colspan="2"   | Social and Liberal Democrats gain from Independent Residents
| align="right" | Swing
| align="right" | +21.9
|-

References

1988 English local elections
1988
1980s in the West Midlands (county)